Rhododendron floribundum (繁花杜鹃) is a rhododendron species native to northwestern Guizhou, southwestern Sichuan, and northeastern Yunnan in China, where it grows at altitudes of . The flowers are magenta-rose with crimson flecks and blotch at base.

References

 Franchet, Bull. Soc. Bot. France. 33: 232. 1886.

floribundum